Romeo Neri (26 March 1903 – 23 September 1961) was an Italian gymnast. He won three gold medals at the 1932 Summer Olympics in Los Angeles, becoming, along with Helene Madison of United States, the most successful athlete there. He previously won a silver medal at the 1928 Summer Olympics. In 1934 he won a silver medal and a bronze medal at the world championships in Budapest.

Career 

Neri took swimming, running, weightlifting and boxing before changing to gymnastics. In 1926 he won the national championships in the parallel bars, followed by four all-round titles in 1928–1930 and 1933. At the 1928 Olympics, besides winning a silver on the horizontal bar, he finished fourth on the rings and all-around. At the next games he won the all-around competition with a 5.7-point gap from second place and greatly helped Italy to win the team gold. He also won gold on the parallel bars and finished fourth on the floor. At the 1936 Olympics Neri competed with a torn arm muscle and did not complete his events. He retired from competitions at the onset of World War II, and after the war worked as a gymnastics coach, preparing the national team for the 1952 Olympics and training his sons Romano and Giambattista.

Neri was the first gold medalist from Rimini, and the football stadium there, Stadio Romeo Neri, bears his name.

See also
 Legends of Italian sport - Walk of Fame
 List of multiple Olympic gold medalists
 Stadio Romeo Neri

References

External links
 

1903 births
1961 deaths
Sportspeople from Rimini
Italian male artistic gymnasts
Olympic gymnasts of Italy
Olympic gold medalists for Italy
Olympic silver medalists for Italy
Gymnasts at the 1928 Summer Olympics
Gymnasts at the 1932 Summer Olympics
Gymnasts at the 1936 Summer Olympics
Olympic medalists in gymnastics
Medalists at the 1932 Summer Olympics
Medalists at the 1928 Summer Olympics
Medalists at the World Artistic Gymnastics Championships